The Bronx Yankees were an American basketball team based in the Bronx in New York City, that was a member of the American Basketball League for a brief period.

During the first half of the 1937–38 season, the team became the New York Yankees. They dropped out of the league on 11 January 1938 near the halfway point of their first and only season.

Year-by-year

References

Defunct basketball teams in the United States
Basketball teams in New York City
Basketball teams established in 1938
Basketball teams disestablished in 1939
Sports in the Bronx
1938 establishments in New York City
1939 disestablishments in New York (state)